Frederick Ralph Forman (8 November 1873 – 14 June 1910) was an English professional footballer, who was one of three members of the same family who started his professional career with Derby County before joining Nottingham Forest and going on to play for England, for whom he made three appearances (scoring three times).

Playing career
Forman was born in Aston-on-Trent, Derbyshire, the elder brother of Frank Forman and uncle to Harry Linacre and all three followed a similar career path. Forman played youth football for the local village side before moving up to Beeston Town, where he was spotted by Derby County. County signed him in January 1892 but, after only making only four appearances, he was transferred to East Midlands rivals Nottingham Forest in 1894, where he was soon joined by his brother.

Nottingham Forest
Fred Forman made his debut for Nottingham Forest in the United Counties League on 15 February 1894 in the 3–1 victory against Sheffield United at the Town Ground. His league debut was next season on 22 September 1894 against Everton also at the Town Ground.

He soon became an established player on the wings for Forest, putting in the crosses for centre-forwards Tom McInnes and Charlie Richards, contributing a handful of goals each season as Forest finished each season in mid-table. Illness and injury restricted his appearances in 1897–98 and he played no part in Forest's FA Cup success in which they defeated Forman's former club, Derby County in the final 3–1.

Forman continued to appear regularly for Forest over the next few seasons, until he retired in 1903, after making a total of 181 appearances, scoring forty goals.

England
By the end of the following season (1898–99), he was restored to fitness and was selected for all three England matches in the 1899 British Home Championship, in all of which he played at outside right with his brother Frank at wing half. He made his international debut in the match against Ireland, played at Roker Park, Sunderland on 2 March 1899 when he and Frank became the first brothers from the same professional club to represent England at the same time, a record that stood until Manchester United's Neville brothers repeated the feat in 1996, nearly a century later. England totally dominated the Irish team and the England forwards "scored at will" with four from Gilbert Smith, three from Jimmy Settle and two each from Fred Forman and Steve Bloomer. Frank Forman also got on the score-sheet with the opening goal as England ran out victors by a 13–2 margin. This is still the record number of goals scored by England in a single match and the highest aggregate goals (15) in a game involving England. Forman retained his place for the next match against Wales, played at Ashton Gate, Bristol on 20 March when he scored the third goal in a 4–0 victory, with two from Bloomer. In his third and final appearance, England defeated Scotland 2–1, and thus England retained the Championship.

Fred Forman went on the Unofficial FA Tour of Germany in November 1899. He played in 3 of the 4 games and scored 4 goals.

Career post football
After retiring from football, he pursued his profession as a railway draughtsman. He died at Skegness on 14 June 1910, aged 36.

Career Statistics

Club

International
Source:

International goals
England score listed first, score column indicates score after each Fred Forman goal.

References

External links
 
 Profile on www.englandfc.com
 Article on "You and Yesterday"
 Nottingham Forest career summary

1873 births
1910 deaths
People from Aston-on-Trent
Footballers from Derbyshire
English footballers
England international footballers
Derby County F.C. players
Nottingham Forest F.C. players
English Football League players
Association football inside forwards